John Bolivar Cassoday (July 7, 1830December 30, 1907) was an American lawyer, politician, and judge.  He was the 9th Chief Justice of the Wisconsin Supreme Court and the 27th Speaker of the Wisconsin State Assembly.

Biography

Born in Herkimer County, New York, he moved with his widowed mother to Tioga County, Pennsylvania, at age 3.  After one year at the University of Michigan, he attended the Albany Law School.  He moved to Janesville, Wisconsin, in July 1857 and established a law practice.

Politically, Cassoday was a Republican.  He was a delegate from Wisconsin to the 1864 National Union National Convention, which nominated Abraham Lincoln for re-election, and was also a candidate for Wisconsin State Assembly that year on Lincoln's National Union ticket.  He was elected to represent Janesville in the Assembly for the 1865 session, and was later elected to the 1877 session.  In the 1877 session, he was chosen as Speaker by a vote of the Assembly.  In 1880, he was chairman of the Wisconsin delegation to the 1880 Republican National Convention.

Later in 1880, Cassoday was appointed to the Wisconsin Supreme Court by Governor William E. Smith, to fill the vacancy caused by the death of Chief Justice Edward George Ryan.  Cassoday was elected to remain in office in 1881, and was re-elected in 1889 and 1899.  In 1895, Chief Justice Harlow S. Orton died in office.  As the next most senior member of the court, Cassoday became the chief justice.  Cassoday served twelve years as Chief Justice until his death in 1907.

John B. Cassoday is the namesake of Cassoday, Kansas.

References

People from Herkimer County, New York
Politicians from Janesville, Wisconsin
Albany Law School alumni
Chief Justices of the Wisconsin Supreme Court
Members of the Wisconsin State Assembly
1830 births
1907 deaths
Speakers of the Wisconsin State Assembly
19th-century American politicians
19th-century American judges